The Budjak Horde or Belgorod Horde formed part of the Nogai Horde in the 17th and  18th centuries. It settled in the northern Black Sea coast area under protectorate of the Crimean Khanate and the Ottoman Empire's Sanjak of Ozu (Yedisan). Its capital was in Căușeni.

In the 1620s the horde migrated from the Pontic steppes to the steppes of the Budjak region. The  Bilhorod Tatars (20,000-30,000) were nomadic herdsmen. They made forays for slaves and loot into Right-bank Ukraine and Moldavia. In 1770 the horde became a protectorate of the Russian Empire and soon after was dispersed through resettlement in the Azov steppes. From there its remnants emigrated to Turkey during the Crimean War of 1853-1856.

Prominent leaders of the horde included Khan Temir (died 1637), who allegedly established the noble Moldavian family of Cantemirești.

Leaders
 1603–1637 Khan Temir
 Giray family with rank of Serasker

References

External links
 Bilhorod Horde at the Encyclopedia of Ukraine
 Bilhorod Horde at the Ukrainian Soviet Encyclopedia
 Bilhorod Horde at the Institute of history of Ukraine website
 Bucak Horde at The Crimean Tatars: The Diaspora Experience and the Forging of a Nation

Turkic dynasties
Tatar states
States and territories established in the 1620s
Vassal states of the Ottoman Empire